The Big Time is the fifth album by Robin Holcomb, released on June 18, 2002 through Nonesuch Records.

Track listing

Personnel 
Musicians
Bill Frisell – guitar, acoustic guitar
Robin Holcomb – vocals, piano
Wayne Horvitz – Hammond organ, production
Keith Lowe – bass guitar, acoustic bass guitar
Andy Roth – drums
Timothy Young – guitar, acoustic guitar
Production and additional personnel
Danny Barnes – vocals on "A Lazy Farmer Boy" and "Engine 143"
Dave Carter – trumpet on "I Tried to Believe"
Tucker Martine – engineering
Anna McGarrigle – vocals on "Like I Care", "I Tried to Believe" and "Lullaby"
Kate McGarrigle – vocals on "Like I Care", "I Tried to Believe" and "Lullaby"
Steve Moore – trombone on "I Tried to Believe"
Julie Wolf – vocals on "You Look So Much Better"

References 

2002 albums
Robin Holcomb albums
Nonesuch Records albums